= Louis Maʿluf =

Lebanese journalist and writer

- Born: 1867; Lebanon
- Died: 1946 (aged 78–79)
- Occupations: Jesuit priest, scholar, lexicographer
- Writing career
- Language: Arabic
- Notable work: Al-Munjid

Louis Maʿluf (1867 - 1946) was a Jesuit priest, scholar, and lexicographer. He is best known for his work on Arabic language and literature. One of his most significant contributions was the compilation of the Al-Munjid, an Arabic dictionary that has been widely used in the Arab world for many years. His work in lexicography has had a lasting impact on Arabic language studies.

== Major works ==
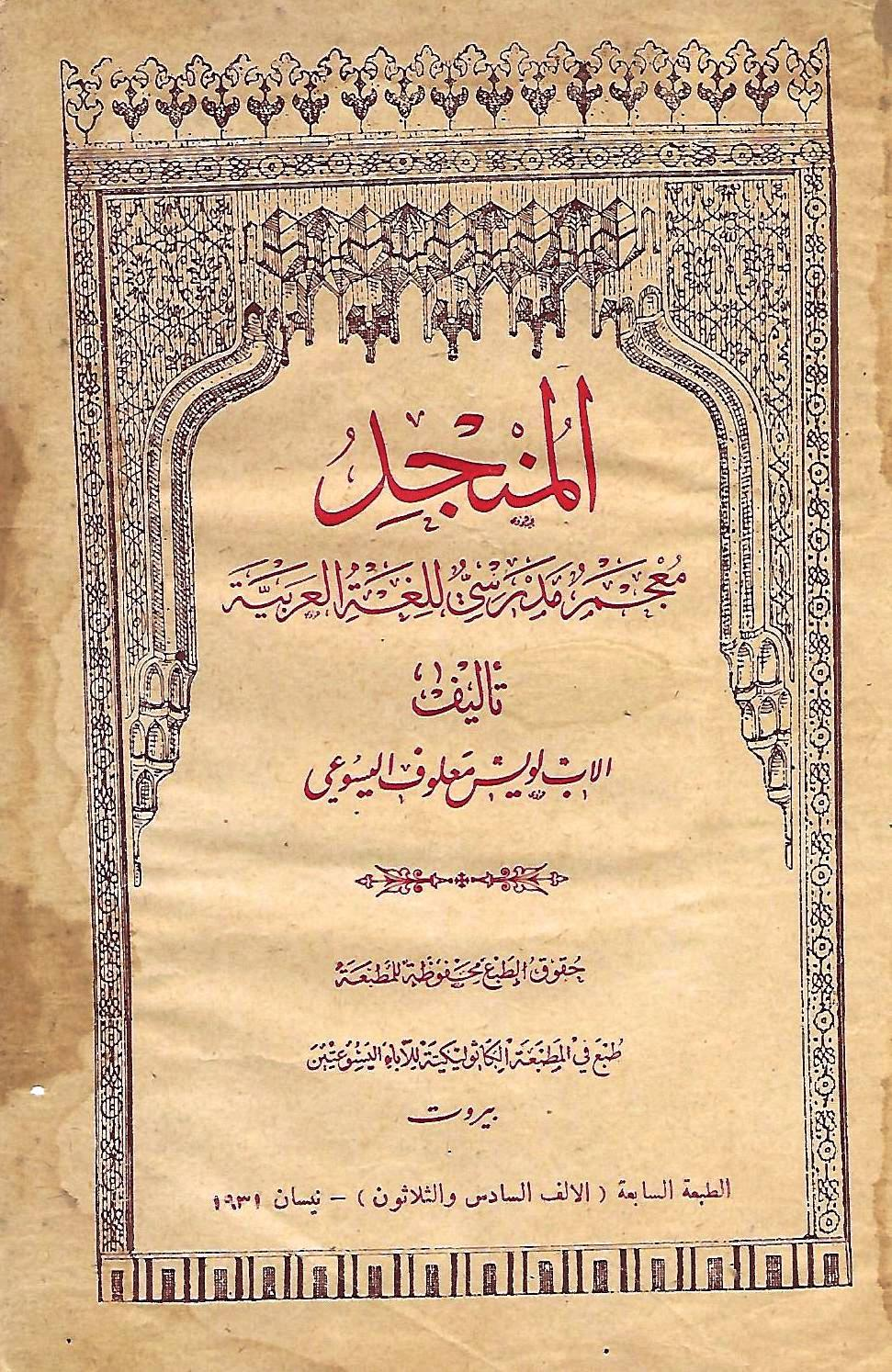

al-Munjid : muʻjam madrasī lil-lughah al-ʻArabīyah (ar): This Arabic dictionary is one of Maʿluf's most renowned works. It has been a crucial resource for students and scholars of the Arabic language. In addition to “Al-Munjid,” Maʿluf authored several other works on Arabic literature and language, contributing to the academic field with his extensive knowledge and research.
